The women's tournament of the 2015 World Senior Curling Championships was held from April 18 to 25 at the Iceberg Skating Palace in Sochi, Russia.

Teams
The teams are listed as follows:

Group A

Group B

Round-robin standings
Final round-robin standings

Round-robin results

Group A

Saturday, April 18
Draw 1
8:00

Draw 3
17:00

Draw 4
20:45

Sunday, April 19
Draw 7
16:00

Monday, April 20
Draw 9
8:00

Draw 11
16:00

Tuesday, April 21
Draw 14
12:00

Draw 16
20:00

Wednesday, April 22
Draw 18
12:00

Draw 19
16:00

Draw 20
20:00

Thursday, April 23
Draw 21
8:00

Draw 23
16:00

Group B

Saturday, April 18
Draw 2
13:15

Sunday, April 19
Draw 8
20:00

Tuesday, April 21
Draw 13
8:00

Draw 14
12:00

Wednesday, April 22
Draw 17
8:00

Thursday, April 23
Draw 23
16:00

Tiebreaker
Friday, April 24, 9:00

Playoffs

Quarterfinals
Friday, April 24, 14:00

Semifinals
Saturday, April 25, 8:00

Bronze medal game
Saturday, April 25, 13:00

Gold medal game
Saturday, April 25, 13:00

References

External links

World Senior Curling Championships
2015 in women's curling
2015 in Russian women's sport
International curling competitions hosted by Russia
Women's curling competitions in Russia